The 2021 Gran Turismo D1 Grand Prix series is the twenty-first season of D1 Grand Prix started on April 24 at Okuibuki Motopark and ended on November 21 at Ebisu Circuit.

Masanori Kohashi is the defending champions.

Teams and Drivers 

Source : 2021 D1GP Drivers

Schedule 

Note : Round 5 and 6 supposed to be held on August 21 and 22, but were postponed due to the rising COVID-19 cases in Japan. The event was moved to November 20 and 21 but the event was not renamed.

Ranking

Drivers' Ranking 

Note : 

 Bold : Tsuiso (Dual-run) Winner
 Italic : Tanso (Single-run) WInner

 † - Round 3 at Tsubaka was abandoned before the final because of curfew.  Both finalists were co-champions for championship purposes, and the points for both first and second place were combined and split, with each driver awarded 21 points each as co-champions.  Akinori Utsumi was symbolically the winner based on higher seed.

Tanso series Ranking 

Note :

Bold : Tanso (Single-run) Winner

Teams' Ranking 

Source : 2021 D1GP Series ranking

External link 
Official Website (In Japanese)

References 

D1 Grand Prix